Wandiligong is a town in north-eastern Victoria, Australia.

Wandiligong was established in the 1850s during the Victorian gold rush and at one stage the town was home to 2,000 people. The town as a whole is now registered with the National Trust of Australia as a historic landscape and is home to buildings with historic value such as the Manchester Unity hall—built in 1874.

The town is home to one of the largest apple orchards in the southern hemisphere.

References

External links

Towns in Victoria (Australia)
Alpine Shire
Mining towns in Victoria (Australia)